Going Nowhere Slowly was a South African travel-orientated television series, that attained cult status. It follows a number of off beat travellers as they cruise across Southern Africa, in an old American muscle car (usually a '1966s Chevrolet Impala known as the Chilli Pepper). Along the way, the characters share their thoughts and experiences, many times ending up in sticky situations, such as running out of gas, falling out of moving cars and with the occasional injury they move through the least travelled spots to find the unique and crazy people who bring the magic to those destinations.

The show was completely unscripted. The travelers covered a total of 150 000 km in 176 episodes through the following countries: South Africa, Namibia, Zambia, Swaziland, Lesotho, Botswana, Zimbabwe, Mozambique, Malawi, Tanzania and Madagascar.

The show launched some of the actors into careers as comedians, the well remembered characters include Vivienne Vermaak, Stuart Taylor, Marc Lottering, Ian Roberts and Fiona Coyne.

The programme aired on SABC3 from 2005 to 2009. After its initial season in 2005, it was renewed by the SABC for an additional 153 Episodes over six more Seasons, the series ended in 2009 having airing 176 episodes in seven Seasons . In the United States, it was syndicated for broadcast on The Africa Channel. A book for the second season, Red Car Diaries, was published in 2006. This hit show syndicated across the planet, became the most successful travel documentary out of Africa.

During and after the last couple of seasons, the production company Big Blue Productions attempted to take the programme concept globally.

Notes

References
 

2005 South African television series debuts
South African documentary television series
SABC 3 original programming